Darius Draudvila (born 29 March 1983) is a Lithuanian decathlon and heptathlon track and field athlete, who internationally competes for Lithuania, but lives in the United States. During studies in USA, Darius represented Kansas State track & field team and his personal best in decathlon take 4th place in Kansas State team's history.  In 2008 Draudvila set a national heptathlon record.

His personal best is 8032 points, which he achieved in 2010 at the European Championships in Barcelona. He also received a nomination for the 2010 World Fair Play Awards as a result of his conduct at the event – he gave his spare pole to Andrei Krauchanka in the vault contest when the Belarusian athlete's equipment had snapped. This enabled Krauchanka to continue in the decathlon, where he went on to take the bronze, while Draudvila ended the competition in sixth place.

Draudvila competed in the International Decathlon at Hexham (GBR) in 2008 and 2010. In 2008 he did not finish the 1500m and the meeting was won by Dean Macey (GBR) in his last decathlon before retiring. In 2010, Draudvila was in great shape and managed to set a meeting record in the 110m hurdles (14.11sec) with a + 5.7m tail wind. He also won the decathlon with 7643 points 199 points below the meeting record set by Macey back in 2004.

Achievements

References 

1983 births
Living people
Lithuanian decathletes
Lithuanian heptathletes
Athletes (track and field) at the 2012 Summer Olympics
Olympic athletes of Lithuania